

Ferris wheels
Myrtle Beach SkyWheel, at Myrtle Beach, South Carolina, US
Niagara SkyWheel, at Clifton Hill, Niagara Falls, Ontario, Canada
Sky Wheel, at Janfusun Fancyworld, Douliu, Yunlin, Taiwan

Double wheels
Sky Wheel, a type of amusement ride produced by Allan Herschell Company, New York, US
Sky Wheel, an amusement ride at Cedar Point, Sandusky, Ohio, US

Roller coasters
Sky Wheel, a SkyLoop coaster, at Skyline Park, Bad Wörishofen, Bavaria, Germany